Combined statistical area (CSA) is a United States Office of Management and Budget (OMB) term for a combination of adjacent metropolitan (MSA) and micropolitan statistical areas (µSA) across the 50 US states and the territory of Puerto Rico that can demonstrate economic or social linkage. CSAs were first designated in 2003. The OMB defines a CSA as consisting of various combinations of adjacent metropolitan and micropolitan areas with economic ties measured by commuting patterns. These areas that combine retain their own designations as metropolitan or micropolitan statistical areas within the larger combined statistical area.

The primary distinguishing factor between a CSA and an MSA/µSA is that the social and economic ties between the individual MSAs/µSAs within a CSA are at lower levels than between the counties within an MSA. CSAs represent multiple metropolitan or micropolitan areas that have an employment interchange of at least 15%. CSAs often represent regions with overlapping labor and media markets.

As of 2021, there are 172 combined statistical areas across the United States, plus another three in the territory of Puerto Rico.



List of combined statistical areas 

The following table lists the 172 combined statistical areas (CSAs) of the United States with the following information:
The CSA rank by population as of July 1, 2021, as estimated by the U.S. Census Bureau
The CSA name as designated by the United States Office of Management and Budget
The CSA population as of July 1, 2021, as estimated by the United States Census Bureau
The CSA population as of April 1, 2020, as enumerated by the 2020 United States census
The percent CSA population change from April 1, 2020, to July 1, 2021
The core-based statistical areas (CBSAs) that constitute the CSA
(Metropolitan statistical areas that are not also combined with other MSAs or CBSAs are not listed below.)

Puerto Rico
The following sortable table lists the three combined statistical areas (CSAs) of Puerto Rico with the following information:
The CSA rank by population as of July 1, 2021, as estimated by the United States Census Bureau
The CSA name as designated by the United States Office of Management and Budget
The CSA population as of July 1, 2021, as estimated by the United States Census Bureau
The CSA population as of April 1, 2020, as enumerated by the 2020 United States census
The percent CSA population change from April 1, 2020, to July 1, 2021
The core-based statistical areas (CBSAs) that constitute the CSA

See also

Demographics of the United States
United States Census Bureau
List of U.S. states and territories by population
List of metropolitan areas of the United States
List of United States cities by population
List of United States counties and county-equivalents

United States Office of Management and Budget
Megaregions of the United States

References

External links

United States Census Bureau
USCB population estimates
United States Office of Management and Budget

 
Demographics of the United States
United States Census Bureau geography
2003 introductions
2003 establishments in the United States